The 2021 Russian Figure Skating Championships were held from 23 to 27 December 2020 in Chelyabinsk. Medals were awarded in the disciplines of men's singles, ladies' singles, pair skating, and ice dance. The results were among the criteria used to select the Russian team for the 2021 World Championships.

Qualifying 
During the 2020–21 season, Russian skaters competed in domestic qualifying events for national championships at various age levels. The Russian Cup series will lead to three events – the Russian Championships, the Russian Junior Championships, and the Russian Cup Final.

Due to the COVID-19 pandemic, there were limited international competitive opportunities and all skaters were required to qualify through the Russian Cup series. The Figure Skating Federation of Russia initially did not award exemptions for injury, illness, or skaters who trained abroad. On 16 November, FFKKR president Alexander Gorshkov announced a review of the qualification process after several national team members were unable to meet the two event qualification requirement.

Controversy 
In December 2020, the Russian Federation drew criticism for its decision to host several competitions with an audience present, despite the worsening COVID-19 pandemic in Russia and the increasing number of its national team members who tested positive for COVID-19. Several skaters, including reigning European and national champions Dmitri Aliev and Victoria Sinitsina / Nikita Katsalapov, as well as reigning European champion Alena Kostornaia, withdrew from the Russian Cup series and/or Championships due to contracting the virus.

Medals summary

Senior Championships 
The 2021 Russian Championships were held in Chelyabinsk, Chelyabinsk Oblast from 23 to 27 December 2020.

There were two separate bases for qualification:
  Qualification based on inclusion in official pre-season national team roster.
 Qualification based on Russian Cup series' results.

Schedule
Listed in local time (UTC+05:00).

Preliminary entries 
The Figure Skating Federation of Russia published the official list of participants on 9 December 2020.

Changes to preliminary entries

Results

Men

Ladies

Pairs

Ice dance

Junior Championships 
The 2021 Russian Junior Championships (Russian: Первенство России среди юниоров 2021) will be held in Krasnoyarsk, Krasnoyarsk Krai from 1 to 5 February 2021. Competitors qualified through the Russian Cup series' junior-level events. The competition would have been part of the selection criteria for the cancelled 2021 World Junior Championships.

There were three separate bases for qualification:
 Qualification based on inclusion in official pre-season national junior team roster.
  Qualification based on competing at the 2021 Russian Senior Championships.
  Qualification based on Russian Cup series' junior-level results.

Schedule
Listed in local time (UTC+07:00).

Entries 
The Figure Skating Federation of Russia published the official list of participants on 26 January 2021.

Changes to preliminary entries 

The competition would have been part of the selection criteria for the 2021 World Junior Championships. However, due to the COVID-19 pandemic, the International Skating Union cancelled the majority of all international junior competitions, including the 2020–21 ISU Junior Grand Prix and the World Junior Championships. As a result, several prominent juniors, such as reigning World and Russian Junior champion Kamila Valieva and World Junior silver medalist Daria Usacheva, decided to forgo the Russian Junior Championships (as well as other national junior-level competitions) and to focus solely on domestic senior-level competitions instead.

Some skaters who qualified to the 2021 Russian Junior Championships based on Russian Cup series' junior-level results were forced to withdraw from the tournament due to health issues (injury or sickness) – namely single skaters Matvei Vetlugin and Mariia Zakharova as well as ice dancers Sofya Tyutyunina / Alexander Shustitskiy.

Results

Men

Ladies

Pairs

Ice dance

International team selections

European Championships 
The 2021 European Championships, scheduled to be held in Zagreb, Croatia from 25 to 31 January 2021, were cancelled on 10 December 2020.

Winter Universiade
The 2021 Winter Universiade, originally scheduled for 21–31 January 2021 in Lucerne, Switzerland, was postponed to 11–21 December 2021 and thus will be held during the next season.

European Youth Olympic Winter Festival
The 2021 European Youth Olympic Winter Festival, originally scheduled for 6–13 February 2021 in Vuokatti, Finland, was postponed to 11–18 December 2021 and thus will be held during the next season.

World Junior Championships 
Commonly referred to as "Junior Worlds", the 2021 World Junior Championships, scheduled to take place in Harbin, China from 1 to 7 March 2021, were cancelled on 24 November 2020.

World Championships 
The 2021 World Championships were held in Stockholm, Sweden from 22 to 28 March 2021. On 27 December 2020 it was officially declared that all winners of the Russian Senior Championships became the first members of the Russia's team. The other members were named on 1 March 2021.

World Team Trophy
The 2021 World Team Trophy was held in Osaka, Japan from 15 to 18 April 2021. The list of participants of the Russia's team was officially published on 29 March 2021.

References 

Russian Figure Skating Championships
Russian Championships
Russian Championships
Figure Skating Championships
Figure Skating Championships